Stephen Ayodeji Akinwale Fagbemi is an Anglican bishop in Nigeria: he is the current Bishop of Owo.

Fagbemi  was born in Oba-Ile, Ondo State. He was educated at Immanuel College of Theology and Christian Education, Ibadan and the  University of Kent. After curacies in Owo and Iyere he was Priest in charge at  Wakajaye-Etile.  He was Vicar of Emure-Ile from 1996 to 2000; and had permission to officiate in the Diocese of Canterbury from 2000 to 2003. He was Co-ordinating Chaplain in Sunderland from 2004 to 2011; and Dean of Archbishop Vining College of Theology from 2011 to 2016. He was General Secretary of the Church of Nigeria from 2016 until his elevation to the episcopate in 2017.

He was consecrated as Bishop of Oyo at the Cathedral Church of St. James the Great, Oke-Bola, Ibadan,  on 30 July 2017. He admonishes the government and the people of Nigeria on the political and economic situation in Nigeria

Notes

Living people
Anglican bishops of Owo
21st-century Anglican bishops in Nigeria
People from Ondo State
Alumni of the University of Kent
University of Ibadan alumni
Nigerian educators
Anglican deans in Africa
Year of birth missing (living people)